Rainbow Bridge connects Fidalgo Island and La Conner, crossing Swinomish Channel in Skagit County, Washington.

References

External links 
 

Bridges completed in 1957
Transportation buildings and structures in Skagit County, Washington
Road bridges in Washington (state)
Arch bridges in the United States
Steel bridges in the United States